Nicolas Dalby (born November 16, 1984) is a Danish mixed martial artist who is currently fighting in the Welterweight division of Ultimate Fighting Championship. A professional since 2008, he is both a former Welterweight and interim welterweight champion in Cage Warriors.

Mixed martial arts career

Background and early career
Nicolas Dalby started learning karate as a teen to defend himself against bullies. He moved from Sønderborg to Copenhagen to be around his friends. After five years of training karate, he started training in Rumble Sports, one of the biggest MMA gyms in Copenhagen. He had a total of five amateur fights, losing the first one by decision and winning the rest of them. Dalby was quickly recognized for his powerful striking and knockout power. He became one of the most feared strikers in Europe after many brutal knockouts.

Cage Warriors Fighting Championship
In 2014, Dalby gained two victories in the Cage Warriors, including a TKO stoppage of Sergei Churilov to earn the CWFC Welterweight Championship.

Ultimate Fighting Championship
Dalby made his promotional debut against Elizeu Zaleski dos Santos on 30 May 2015 at UFC Fight Night 67.  He won the fight via split decision.

Dalby next faced Darren Till on 24 October 2015 at UFC Fight Night 76. The bout ended in a majority draw. Both fighters were awarded Fight of the Night honors.

Dalby was expected to face Bartosz Fabinski on 10 April 2016 at UFC Fight Night 86. However, on March 2, Fabiński was removed from the card due to undisclosed reasons and replaced by Zak Cummings. Dalby lost the fight via unanimous decision.

Dalby next faced Peter Sobotta on 3 September 2016 at UFC Fight Night 93. He lost the fight by unanimous decision and was subsequently released from the promotion.

Return to the UFC
Despite struggling with depression and alcoholism stemming from unsuccessful UFC stint, Dalby racked up 3–1 (1 NC) record in Cage Warriors including winning interim Welterweight Championship. Dalby was re-signed to the UFC in mid-2019 and faced Alex Oliveira on 28 September 2019 at UFC on ESPN+ 18. He won the fight via unanimous decision.

Dalby was scheduled to face Danny Roberts on 21 March 2020 at  UFC Fight Night: Woodley vs. Edwards. Due to the COVID-19 pandemic, the event was eventually postponed . The bout with Roberts was rescheduled and was expected to take place on 26 July 2020 at UFC on ESPN 14. However, Roberts pulled out of the bout citing injury and he was replaced by Jesse Ronson. Dalby lost the fight via a rear-naked choke in round one. The fight result turned to no contest after Ronson received USADA handed 22 month suspension for testing positive for Metandienone.

Dalby was scheduled to face Orion Cosce on 21 November 2020 at UFC 255. However, Cosce was pulled from the event for undisclosed reason and he was replaced by  Daniel Rodriguez. Dalby won the fight via unanimous decision.

Dalby was scheduled to face Sergey Khandozhko on 26 June 2021 at UFC Fight Night 190. However, Khandozhko pulled out due to injury and was replaced by Tim Means. Dalby lost the fight via unanimous decision.

Dalby faced Cláudio Silva  on July 23, 2022, at UFC Fight Night 208. He won the fight via unanimous decision.

Dalby faced Warlley Alves on January 21, 2023, at UFC 283. He won the fight via split decision.

Championships and accomplishments

Mixed martial arts
Ultimate Fighting Championship
Fight of the Night (One time) vs. Darren Till
Cage Warriors Fighting Championship
CWFC Welterweight Championship (One time)
One successful title defense
Interim CWFC Welterweight Championship (One time)
European MMA
EMMA Welterweight Championship (One time)
Fighter Gala
FG Welterweight Championship (One time)
One successful title defense
Nordic MMA Awards - MMAviking.com
2014 Knockout of the Year vs. Sergei Churilov on March 22
2015 Comeback of the Year vs. Darren Till on October 24
 2019 Comeback Fighter of the Year

Mixed martial arts record

|-
|Win
|align=center|21–4–1 (2)
|Warlley Alves
|Decision (split)
|UFC 283
|
|align=center|3
|align=center|5:00
|Rio de Janeiro, Brazil
|
|-
|Win
|align=center|20–4–1 (2)
|Cláudio Silva
|Decision (unanimous)
|UFC Fight Night: Blaydes vs. Aspinall 
|
|align=center|3
|align=center|5:00
|London, England
|
|-
|Loss
|align=center|19–4–1 (2)
|Tim Means
|Decision (unanimous)
|UFC Fight Night: Gane vs. Volkov
|
|align=center|3
|align=center|5:00
|Las Vegas, Nevada, United States
|
|-
|Win
|align=center|19–3–1 (2)
|Daniel Rodriguez
|Decision (unanimous)
|UFC 255
|
|align=center|3
|align=center|5:00
|Las Vegas, Nevada, United States
|
|-
|NC
|align=center|18–3–1 (2)
|Jesse Ronson
|NC (overturned)
|UFC on ESPN: Whittaker vs. Till 
|
|align=center|1
|align=center|2:48
|Abu Dhabi, United Arab Emirates
|
|-
|Win
|align=center|18–3–1 (1)
|Alex Oliveira
|Decision (unanimous)
|UFC Fight Night: Hermansson vs. Cannonier 
|
|align=center|3
|align=center|5:00
|Copenhagen, Denmark
|
|- 
|NC
|align=center|
|Ross Houston
|NC (surface deemed unsafe)
|Cage Warriors FC 106
|
|align=center|3
|align=center|2:05
|London, England
|
|- 
|Win
|align=center|17–3–1
|Alex Lohore
|TKO (punches)
|Cage Warriors FC 103
|
|align=center|4
|align=center|2:47
|Copenhagen, Denmark
|
|- 
|Win
|align=center|16–3–1
|Philip Mulpeter
|TKO (punches)
|Cage Warriors FC 100
|
|align=center|3
|align=center|3:32
|Cardiff, Wales
|
|- 
| Win
|align=center| 15–3–1
|Roberto Allegretti
|Technical Submission (rear-naked choke)
|Cage Warriors FC 96
|
|align=center|2
|align=center|0:50
|Liverpool, England
|
|-
|Loss
|align=center| 14–3–1
|Carlo Pedersoli Jr.
| Decision (split)
| Cage Warriors FC 93
|
|align=center|3
|align=center|5:00
|Gothenburg, Sweden
|  
|-
|Loss
|align=center| 14–2–1
|Peter Sobotta
| Decision (unanimous)
|UFC Fight Night: Arlovski vs. Barnett
|
|align=center|3
|align=center|5:00
|Hamburg, Germany
|  
|-
|Loss
|align=center|14–1–1
|Zak Cummings
|Decision (unanimous)
|UFC Fight Night: Rothwell vs. dos Santos
|
|align=center|3
|align=center|5:00
|Zagreb, Croatia
| 
|-
|Draw
|align=center|14–0–1
|Darren Till
|Draw (majority) 
|UFC Fight Night: Holohan vs. Smolka
|
|align=center|3
|align=center|5:00
|Dublin, Ireland
|
|-
| Win
| align=center| 14–0
| Elizeu Zaleski dos Santos
| Decision (split)
| UFC Fight Night: Condit vs. Alves
| 
| align=center| 3
| align=center| 5:00
| Goiânia, Brazil
|
|-
| Win
| align=center| 13–0
| Mohsen Bahari
| Decision (unanimous)
| Cage Warriors FC 74
| 
| align=center| 5
| align=center| 5:00
| London, England
|
|-
| Win
| align=center| 12–0
| Sergei Churilov
| TKO (head kick and punches)
| Cage Warriors FC 66
| 
| align=center| 4
| align=center| 2:19
| Ballerup, Denmark
|
|-
| Win
| align=center| 11–0
| Morten Djursaa
| TKO (punches)
| European MMA 6: The Real Deal
| 
| align=center| 1
| align=center| 0:27
| Brøndby, Denmark
|
|-
| Win
| align=center| 10–0
| Ivica Trušček
| Decision (unanimous)
| World Kickboxing Network: Valhalla - Battle of the Vikings
| 
| align=center| 3
| align=center| 5:00
| Aarhus, Denmark
|
|-
| Win
| align=center| 9–0
| Ivica Trušček
| Decision (unanimous)
| Royal Arena 2
| 
| align=center| 3
| align=center| 5:00
| Brøndby, Denmark
|
|-
| Win
| align=center| 8–0
| Cristian Brinzan
| Submission (arm-triangle choke)
| Fighter Gala 25 
| 
| align=center| 2
| align=center| 4:45
| Frederiksberg, Denmark
|
|-
| Win
| align=center| 7–0
| Acoidan Duque
| Decision (unanimous)
| Royal Arena
| 
| align=center| 3
| align=center| 5:00
| Brøndby, Denmark
|
|-
| Win
| align=center| 6–0
| Glenn Sparv
| Decision (unanimous)
| Cage Fight Live 2
| 
| align=center| 3
| align=center| 5:00
| Herning, Denmark
|
|-
| Win
| align=center| 5–0
| Mindaugas Baranauskas
| KO (punch)
| Fighter Gala 23: Cage Fight
| 
| align=center| 1
| align=center| 1:22
| Copenhagen, Denmark
|
|-
| Win
| align=center| 4–0
| Raymond Jarman
| Submission (rear-naked choke)
| Fighter Gala 17: House of Pain
| 
| align=center| 2
| align=center| 1:08
| Odense, Denmark
|
|-
| Win
| align=center| 3–0
| Raimondas Sinica
| KO (punches)
| Fighter Gala 16: Bad Boys
| 
| align=center| 1
| align=center| 0:06
| Helsingør, Denmark
|
|-
| Win
| align=center| 2–0
| Jaroslav Poborský
| Decision (unanimous)
| Fighter Gala 13: Raw
| 
| align=center| 3
| align=center| 5:00
| Copenhagen, Denmark
|
|-
| Win
| align=center| 1–0
| Laurens-Jan Thijssen
| Submission (rear-naked choke)
| Fighter Gala: Fight Night 5
| 
| align=center| 3
| align=center| 2:35
| Sønderborg, Denmark
|

Amateur mixed martial arts record (Incomplete) 

|-
| Win
|align=center| 3–1
| Martin Johansen
| TKO (punches)
| Adrenaline 3: Evolution
| 
|align=center| 2
|align=center| N/A
| Hvidovre, Denmark
| 
|-
| Win
|align=center| 2–1
| Steffen Andersen
| KO (head kick)
| Adrenaline 1: Feel the Rush
| 
|align=center| 1
|align=center| 1:59
| Hvidovre, Denmark
| 
|-
| Win
|align=center| 1–1
| Morten Ørskov
| TKO (punches)
| FighterGalla 4
| 
|align=center| 1
|align=center| N/A
| Odense, Denmark
| 
|-
| Loss
|align=center| 0–1
| Uldal Koubti
| Decision (unanimous)
| Shooters MMA: Fightergalla 1
| 
|align=center| N/A
|align=center| N/A
| Odense, Denmark
| 
|-

References

External links
Official YouTube channel
 
 

1984 births
People from Silkeborg
Living people
Danish male mixed martial artists
Mixed martial artists utilizing Ashihara kaikan
Mixed martial artists utilizing Brazilian jiu-jitsu
Danish male karateka
Welterweight mixed martial artists
Danish practitioners of Brazilian jiu-jitsu
Danish male kickboxers
Ultimate Fighting Championship male fighters
Sportspeople from the Central Denmark Region